Johanne Gomis (born 11 July 1985 in Nogent-sur-Marne, France) is a French basketball player. Gomis has had 15 selections on the French national women's basketball team since 2010.

She currently plays for the ESB Villeneuve-d'Ascq team.

References 

French women's basketball players
Sportspeople from Nogent-sur-Marne
Living people
1985 births